The Rural Municipality of Cameron is a former rural municipality (RM) in the Canadian province of Manitoba. It was originally incorporated as a rural municipality on November 16, 1896. It ceased on January 1, 2015 as a result of its provincially mandated amalgamation with the RM of Whitewater and the Town of Hartney to form the Municipality of Grassland.

The RM was located southwest of Brandon and was home to about 500 people. It was named for John Donald Cameron, the Attorney General of Manitoba at the time.

Communities 
Former towns: (previously independently administered)
Hartney

Unincorporated communities:
Argue
Grande Clairière
Lauder
Underhill

Attractions 
 Fort Desjarlais
 Fort Ash
 Fort Grand
 Hart-Cam Museum
 Lauder Sandhills

References 

 Cameron Rural Municipality - Website
 Manitoba Historical Society - Rural Municipality of Cameron
 Map of Cameron R.M. at Statcan

Cameron
Populated places disestablished in 2015
2015 disestablishments in Manitoba